2/0 may refer to:

 A wire gauge size
 2/0 in American wire gauge
 2/0 in British Standard wire gauge
 "Two Divided by Zero", a song by Pet Shop Boys from the album Please

See also
 Division by zero